Durham Academy is an independent, coeducational, day school in Durham, North Carolina, whose 1,237 students range from pre-kindergarten to grade 12.

The school has four divisions, each with its own director: Preschool (Pre-kindergarten/Kindergarten), Lower School (grades 1–4), Middle School (grades 5–8) and Upper School (grades 9–12). These are arrayed on three campuses that comprise four acres.

Thirty-eight percent of Durham Academy's students are people of color, as are 17 percent of teachers.

In 2019–20, Durham Academy awarded more than $2,200,000 in financial aid (not including tuition remission and need-based financial aid for faculty and staff); the average award was $14,682.

History
Durham Academy was founded in 1933, as the Calvert Method School, by George Watts Hill and his wife. The couple established the school as a private, independent school to educate their children. The school's teaching philosophy (and its name) were based on the Calvert School in Baltimore, Maryland, which Ann McCollough Hill attended as a child. The Calvert Method School's first home was in Durham's Forest Hills neighborhood, with the neighborhood's clubhouse serving as a classroom for seven students and one teacher.

In 1937, the Calvert Method School moved to John Sprunt Hill's former home at 815 S. Duke Street.

In 1959, the school ended its affiliation with Baltimore's Calvert School and changed its name to Durham Academy. Durham Academy also became a member of the National Council of Independent Schools and added an eighth grade.

In May 1965, Durham Academy broke ground on a new campus on Highway 751 (later named Academy Road). Students and teachers moved into the new facility in March 1966.

In 1971, Durham Academy purchased and broke ground on 42 acres of land on Ridge Road to launch the Upper School. The Upper School opened in September 1973, and Durham Academy's first senior class graduated in June 1975.

In 1977, George Watts Hill, Fred Brooks and Bill Friday founded the Learning Development Center (now known as The Hill Center), for children with learning differences. The LDC, located on Durham Academy's Ridge Road campus, had a link to Durham Academy, but had its own faculty and a separate facility for its 13 students and four teachers. The Hill Center currently operates as an affiliate of Durham Academy in its facility on Pickett Rd. The center's focus is on intensive remediation and tutoring for students with learning differences and training teachers to help students with learning differences.

By 1978 Durham Academy had grown to 795 students in grades K–12. From the late 1970s to early 1980s the school developed an honor code, a Cum Laude Society, a faculty summer grants program and established an excellence in teaching award named after then-headmaster F. Robertson Hershey.

In 1983, Durham Academy celebrated its 50th anniversary with ceremonies led by founder George Watts Hill.

In 1986, the school added to the Academy Road campus with a new library/arts/science building. That same year, Durham Academy began hosting the Durham County Special Olympics, which includes an estimated 400 athletes from all Durham County Public Schools.

The late 1980s and early 1990s saw major Middle School and Upper School expansions, the development of Upper School experiential education programming and growth in the number of Durham Academy athletic teams to twice their size.

In August 2002, Durham Academy's Preschool and Lower School moved to 17 acres on the Ridge Road campus. The building opened has been recognized by the Chicago Athenaeum: Museum of Architecture and Design for its style.

In 2004, the school was ranked first in the Southeast by the New York Times and 30th in the nation by Forbes.

The Upper School Learning Commons opened in February 2012. The 7,000-square foot building includes a library, college counseling, a student store, a faculty work room, and a computer lab with 20 iMac stations. The building also houses classroom and office space.

The Upper School Kirby Gym opened in January 2013. The renovation and expansion resulted in seating for 900 spectators, a fitness center, locker rooms and trainer facility.

Durham Academy received widespread press on February 12, 2014, after school administrators used rap music in a video announcing that the school would be closed due to snow.

In 2015, Durham Academy's auditioned a cappella group, XIV Hours, released a video entitled "Lost in the Game" that discussed the sexual nature of many popular song lyrics. The video quickly became popular and was covered in several major news sites, including MTV and the Huffington Post. The music video was also nominated for Best High School Video in the 2016 CASA A Capella Video awards.

Academics
Students at Durham Academy have won national titles in chess   and debate, and a member of the Class of 2007 was awarded second place in the Intel Science Talent Search. Over the past four years, Durham Academy has had 49 National Merit Scholarship finalists.

Sixty-four percent of faculty members hold advanced degrees, and they average 19 years of teaching experience. Lower School science teacher Lyn Streck was named the 2008 NC Conservation Education Teacher of the Year for involving students, faculty and parents in a variety of environmental efforts. Meanwhile, Upper School history teacher Mike Spatola was recognized by the Stanford Teacher Tribute Initiative in 2011  and received a 2012 Outstanding Educator Award from the University of Chicago

Athletics
Durham academy's athletic offerings include field hockey, volleyball, cross-country, tennis, soccer, swimming, basketball, lacrosse, softball, track and field, baseball and golf. Durham Academy had the first high school boys lacrosse program in Durham County.  Seventy-five percent of the students in grades seven through twelve participate in athletics, with 44 athletic teams in 20 different sports.

Since 2010, Durham Academy has won 2 NCISAA state championships and had 10 NCISAA championship runner-up finishes. In 2015–16, the school had 51 TISAC All-Conference athletes, 14 NCISAA All-State athletes and 4 All-American athletes.

The girls cross country team won the 2018 NCISAA state championship. The boys cross country team won the TISAC conference championship title in 2018 and placed second at the NCISAA state championship. The varsity girls field hockey team won the 2012 North Carolina Independent Schools Athletic Association championship. The cross country and track programs at Durham Academy are particularly notable, with 39 team state championships and 196 individual titles during the tenure of former head coach Dennis Cullen.

Several Durham Academy athletes have gone on to Division I programs, including Duke University, University of Vermont, U.S. Naval Academy, Wake Forest University, Harvard University and the University of North Carolina. Among those athletes are Mollie Pathman, the 2009-2010 Gatorade National Girls Soccer Player, who played on the U.S. women's Under-20 national team at the 2012 World Cup, Evan Fjeld, a McDonald's All-American nominee who graduated from the University of Vermont and has played professionally in the NBA D-League as well as in Malta and Switzerland, and Lauren Blazing, Duke's field hockey goalkeeper, who was one of three nominees for 2016 NCAA Woman of the Year, played with the USWNT in the 2016 Rio Olympics, was a three-time All-American, a two-time Capital One first team Academic All-American athlete and won ACC Field Hockey Scholar-Athlete of the Year twice.

Arts
Durham Academy's arts classes include chorus, band, photography, filmmaking, ceramics, mixed media arts, acting studio, screenwriting, playwriting, and various levels of dance.

Durham Academy arts alumni include Alvin Ailey dancer and choreographer Hope Boykin, "The Affair" co-creator and showrunner Sarah Treem, and actor Ward Horton.

"In the Pocket", an audition-based musical group, has performed at venues around the city and the country. There are also several extracurricular a cappella singing groups.

XIV Hours has been included four times on Best of High School A Capella annual compilations, with their most recent inclusion on the 2017 compilation.

Speech and debate
Durham Academy's debate team has won various national and regional competitions, including the National Speech and Debate Association National Championship, Harvard, Glenbrooks, Wake Forest, George Mason, Florida Blue Key, Laird Lewis, and the Sunvitational. In addition, the team has won multiple state and district championships.

Notable alumni

 Lauren Blazing – field hockey player for the U.S. women's national team
 Hope Boykin – dancer and choreographer
 Brendan Bradley – actor, producer, writer, and director
 Ray Chadwick – Major League Baseball pitcher
 Anthony Roth Costanzo – countertenor, actor, and producer who has led performances at opera companies around the world
 Matt Crawford – former Major League Soccer player
 Tate Fogleman – professional stock car racing driver
 Ward Horton – actor
 John Pardon – mathematician who works on geometry and topology
 Mollie Pathman – professional women's soccer player
 Sarah Treem –  TV writer-producer and playwright

See also
 List of high schools in North Carolina

References

External links
 
official Speech and Debate website

Private high schools in North Carolina
Private middle schools in North Carolina
Private elementary schools in North Carolina
Education in Durham, North Carolina
Educational institutions established in 1933
Schools in Durham County, North Carolina
1933 establishments in North Carolina